The 2019–20 EFL Championship (referred to as the Sky Bet Championship for sponsorship reasons) was the 16th season of the Football League Championship under its current title and the 28th season under its current league division format. Leeds United won the title, with West Bromwich Albion following in second. Brentford finished closely in third, only to be beaten in the playoff final to 4th placed Fulham by a narrow 2–1 victory at Wembley.

Effects of the COVID-19 pandemic

The season was halted, following a decision on 13 March 2020 to suspend the league after a number of players and other club staff became ill due to the COVID-19 pandemic. The initial suspension was until 4 April, which was then extended until 30 April. On 13 May, following a meeting, the clubs decided to continue with the season with plans for players to return to training on 25 May.

In May, 1014 tests were carried out across all of the English Football League and funded by the clubs. Two people from Hull City returned positive results. Later in May, Elliott Bennett of Blackburn Rovers tested positive for the virus as did two unnamed players from Fulham. In further tests, Jayden Stockley of Preston North End tested positive as did one unnamed person from both Cardiff City and Middlesbrough. On 31 May, the EFL stated plans to restart the league on 20 June, with the play-off final being scheduled for around 30 July, subject to safety requirement and government approval being met.

On 7 June, two Championship clubs reported one person each to have tested positive of coronavirus, during the latest round of testing. A total of 1,179 people were tested in the duration of four days and those tested positive were required to self-isolate, as per EFL guidelines. On 8 June, the first round of fixtures was released. The first set of fixtures following the restart was scheduled for 20 June with the first fixture being Fulham against Brentford with a 12:30pm kick-off. In a further round of testing on 8 June, Stoke City manager Michael O'Neill tested positive for the virus having tested negative in five previous rounds of testing. A practice game between Stoke and Manchester United was called off at short notice with the Stoke players already in United's Carrington training ground.

Team changes
The following teams have changed division since the 2018–19 season.

Stadiums

 1 The capacity of Craven Cottage will be reduced from 25,700 to 19,000 for the 2019–20 and 2020–21 seasons due to the redevelopment of the Riverside Stand which will increase the capacity to 29,600.

Personnel and sponsoring

  Clotet was initially appointed as caretaker manager before he was appointed on a permanent basis on 4 December 2019.
  Bristol City's captain was Bailey Wright in the first half of the season, but he left on 21 January to join Sunderland on loan. Vice-captain Josh Brownhill served in this position between 21 and 30 January when he left for Burnley, no replacement has been named as of 30 January.
  Derby County's captain was Richard Keogh until his contract was terminated on 30 October 2019, with Curtis Davies acting in this position from 30 October until 1 January 2020.
  Huddersfield Town's shirt does not display Paddy Power's logo as part of the bookmakers' "Save Our Shirt" campaign.
  Queens Park Rangers' shirt sponsor was Royal Panda until 29 January 2020 when they decided to leave the United Kingdom market.

Managerial changes

League table

Play-offs

Results

Season statistics

Top scorers

 1 Jarrod Bowen left Hull City and the EFL Championship on 31 January 2020 to sign for Premier League club West Ham United; all of his 16 league goals were scored before this date.

Top assists

Hat-tricks

Awards

Monthly

Annual

PFA Championship Team of the Year

References

 
EFL Championship seasons
1
2
Eng
EFL Championship